Karl Gulbrandsen (22 May 1892 – 28 August 1973) was a Norwegian cyclist. He competed in two events at the 1912 Summer Olympics.

References

External links
 

1892 births
1973 deaths
Norwegian male cyclists
Olympic cyclists of Norway
Cyclists at the 1912 Summer Olympics
Cyclists from Oslo